Verconia nivalis is a species of a dorid nudibranch (a colourful sea slug). It is a shell-less marine gastropod mollusk in the family Chromodorididae.

Distribution

Description

Ecology

References

Chromodorididae
Gastropods described in 1937